Adele Simone Carles (born 19 February 1968) is a former Australian politician. She was a member of the Western Australian Legislative Assembly from 2009 to 2013, representing the electorate of Fremantle. She was initially elected as a Greens WA member at the 2009 Fremantle state by-election, becoming the first Greens candidate to be elected to an Australian state lower house of parliament in a single-member seat. However, she resigned from the Greens on 6 May 2010 to sit as an independent. In November 2010, Carles agreed to guarantee confidence and supply votes for the incumbent Colin Barnett Liberal minority government. She ran for re-election as an independent at the  2013 state election, but was defeated, finishing fourth behind the Labor, Liberal and Greens candidates with 5.49% of the vote.

2008 state election
Carles, a solicitor before entering politics, was defeated in the 2008 state election. She polled 27.6% of the vote against Labor Attorney-General Jim McGinty (38.7%), marginally less than Liberal candidate Brian Christie (30.2%).

2009 Fremantle by-election
In 2009, Carles was preselected by Greens WA to run again at the 2009 Fremantle state by-election following the retirement of McGinty. With the Liberals not contesting the election, Carles was rated a chance of becoming the first Greens candidate to be elected to an Australian state lower house of parliament in a single-member seat.

Carles won the seat with 44.06% of the primary vote, ahead of Labor candidate and former Fremantle Mayor, Peter Tagliaferri, as well as receiving enough preferences from other candidates to gain an absolute majority of ballots cast.  This was the highest primary vote result for the Greens in a state or federal election in Australia, and the first time the Greens had outpolled all other parties on their primary vote. Their previous record vote was 38.96% in the 2005 Marrickville state by-election in New South Wales (also not contested by the Liberals).

Buswell affair
In April 2010, Carles publicly acknowledged that she and Liberal Treasurer, Troy Buswell, had been engaged in a "mutual, albeit stupid" affair that lasted several months. Carles had previously denied the affair despite persistent rumours, claiming to be a victim of a Labor smear campaign.

On 6 May 2010, she resigned from the Greens to sit as an independent.

In December 2012, Troy Buswell launched a $3 million defamation case against Carles in relation to allegations and counter-claims both made about Buswell's alleged lewd and drunken behaviour at the home of  property developer Nigel Satterley in December 2011.

At the 9 March 2013 state election Carles was defeated by Labor's Simone McGurk. She finished second from last with only five percent of the primary vote.

References 
General

Inline

External links 
 Adele Carles’s Blog

1968 births
Living people
Australian Greens members of the Parliament of Western Australia
Independent members of the Parliament of Western Australia
Members of the Western Australian Legislative Assembly
21st-century Australian politicians
21st-century Australian women politicians
Women members of the Western Australian Legislative Assembly